Joelle Hannah Fletcher (born November 1, 1990) is an American television personality. She was a contestant on the twentieth season of ABC's The Bachelor and the lead on the twelfth season of The Bachelorette.

Personal life
Fletcher was born in Dallas, Texas, the child of physician parents. Her mother is from Iran and her father was raised in Tennessee. Prior to going into real estate, Fletcher was a pre-med major at Baylor University. She is married to Jordan Rodgers. After a four year engagement, the couple planned to wed on June 13, 2020. However, due to the COVID-19 pandemic in the United States, they postponed their wedding. They were married on May 14, 2022.

Reality television shows

Ready for Love
Fletcher appeared in the first episode of Ready for Love, on which her half-brother, Ben Patton, was starring.

The Bachelor

Fletcher was a contestant on Ben Higgins' season of The Bachelor. Higgins confessed love for both her and Lauren Bushnell, but ultimately chose Bushnell in finale.

The Bachelorette

Fletcher was announced as the Bachelorette on March 14, 2016, during After the Final Rose. In the end, Fletcher chose former pro-quarterback Jordan Rodgers over runner-up Robby Hayes. The couple currently resides in Dallas.

The Bachelor Winter Games 
Fletcher appeared in one episode of The Bachelor Winter Games where she judged a kissing contest along with Rachel Lindsay and Arie Luyendyk.

Career
In April 2018, Fletcher started working with Marcus by Goldman Sachs as a new ambassador for home improvement loans.  Fletcher's appearances included interviews as a home-renovation expert.

In June 2018, Fletcher announced that she was launching her own clothing line, Fletch.

In September 2018, it was announced that Fletcher and her fiancé, Jordan Rodgers, would appear in a Kin web series Engaged with JoJo and Jordan, described as a combination of reality TV and DIY home decor.

Beginning in July 2019, Fletcher and Rodgers hosted the CNBC reality show Cash Pad. A combination of house flipping and investment shows, the hosts partner with homeowners hoping to turn their properties into ideal short-term rentals.

In September 2019, Fletcher and Rodgers announced they would be hosting Battle of the Fittest Couples for Paramount Network where “ripped couples” compete against each other to win the title "Fittest Couple" and a $100,000 cash prize. The show premiered October 15, 2019.

Fletcher and Rodgers hosted The Big D, a dating reality show for TBS that was set to premiere on July 7, 2022. However, the show was canceled on June 16, three weeks before the premiere. Ten episodes were produced.

References

1990 births
Living people
American people of Iranian descent
Bachelor Nation contestants
Baylor University alumni
People from Dallas